Grand Hotel FC is an Egyptian football club based in Hurghada, Egypt. The club colours are orange, blue and white.

2009/10 they play in the Egyptian Second Division Group A.

References 

Football clubs in Egypt
Sports clubs in Egypt